Shanice Beckford (born 16 April 1995) is a Jamaican netball player. She was part of the teams that won bronze at the 2014 and 2018 Commonwealth Games, and that placed fourth at the 2015 Netball World Cup..

In 2017, Beckford was temporarily suspended from the national team, along with fellow players Khadijah Williams and Nicole Dixon, during a team training incident, but was later cleared of all charges.

References

External links
 

1995 births
Living people
Jamaican netball players
Place of birth missing (living people)
Netball players at the 2018 Commonwealth Games
Commonwealth Games bronze medallists for Jamaica
Commonwealth Games medallists in netball
2019 Netball World Cup players
Team Northumbria netball players
Netball Superleague players
Jamaican expatriate netball people in England
2015 Netball World Cup players
Medallists at the 2014 Commonwealth Games
Medallists at the 2018 Commonwealth Games
Medallists at the 2022 Commonwealth Games